The 1913–14 Dartmouth men's ice hockey season was the 9th season of play for the program.

Season
Dartmouth built upon their success the year before with three wins to open their season. Despite the demise of the Intercollegiate Hockey Association, The Greens had a chance to capture the Intercollegiate Championship if they could defeat the major powers. Their first test came against Princeton and while the team was able to withstand the assault from the Tigers, Dartmouth was unable to score in the game and lost 0–2. The team still had a chance for a title if they could get some help but, after dropping their next game to Harvard, Dartmouth saw their opportunity slip through their fingers.

The offense resurfaced when they began playing again in February and carried the team to four consecutive victories. The Greens ended the year as the third best team in the country (behind only the teams they could not defeat) while Clarence Wanamaker set a program record with 20 goals on the year.

Note: Dartmouth College did not possess a moniker for its athletic teams until the 1920s, however, the university had adopted 'Dartmouth Green' as its school color in 1866.

Roster

Standings

Schedule and Results

|-
!colspan=12 style=";" | Regular Season

References

Dartmouth Big Green men's ice hockey seasons
Dartmouth
Dartmouth
Dartmouth
Dartmouth